"Mirage" is a song performed by French singer M. Pokora. It was written by Pokora and co-written and produced by Gee Futuristic.  It serves as the second single from Pokora's fourth studio album Mise à Jour. It was released on November 22, 2010.

Chart performance 
"Mirage" has been listed for 6 weeks on the France Singles Top 100. It entered the chart on position 72 on week 4/2011, and its last appearance was on week 9/2011. It peaked on number 64, where it stayed for 1 week.

Music video
A music video was released on November 25, 2010 and it shows Pokora dancing with a number of dancers in a studio full of lights.

Charts

Notes

2010 singles
M. Pokora songs
Songs written by M. Pokora
2010 songs
EMI Records singles